James Zell McDonald (born March 29, 1961) is a former American football tight end in the National Football League. He played for the Los Angeles Rams and Detroit Lions. He played college basketball at Southern California (USC) and did not play college football. His son, James McDonald, plays in Major League Baseball.

References

1961 births
Living people
Players of American football from Long Beach, California
American football tight ends
USC Trojans men's basketball players
Los Angeles Rams players
Detroit Lions players
American men's basketball players
National Football League replacement players
Long Beach Polytechnic High School alumni